David Bailie (4 December 1937 – 6 March 2021) was a South African actor, known for his performances on stage, television and film. In the 1960s and 1970s he worked for both the National Theatre and the Royal Shakespeare Company, where he was an associate artist. On TV he played "Dask" in the 1977 Doctor Who serial The Robots of Death, and also appeared in Blake's 7. On film, he played the mute pirate Cotton in the Pirates of the Caribbean series. Bailie was also a professional photographer, specialising in portrait photography. He had a studio in West Kensington, London.

Personal life 
Bailie was born in Springs, South Africa on 4 December 1937, and went to boarding school in Swaziland, before emigrating to Rhodesia (now Zimbabwe) with his family in 1952. His first acting experience soon after school in 1955 was an amateur production of Doctor in the House, which persuaded him he wanted to be an actor. After leaving school he worked in a bank and then for Central African Airlines. In 1958, he made his first trip from Rhodesia to Britain.

Bailie died on 6 March 2021 at the age of 83.

Career 
In 1960 he moved to Britain from South Africa and landed his first small role in the film Flame in the Streets (1961) and then played one of the bell boys in Arthur Kopit's Oh Dad, Poor Dad, Mamma's Hung You in the Closet and I'm Feelin' So Sad (1961) with Stella Adler playing Madame Rospettle. He then bluffed his way into weekly repertory in Barrow-in-Furness as juvenile lead – terrified all the while that he would be exposed as totally inexperienced.

Recognising the need for training, he auditioned three times for a bursary to the RADA—each time being accepted only as a fee-paying student, which he couldn't afford. He finally sent for the last of his standby money (£200) he had left in Rhodesia and paid for the first term (1963). At the end of term he persuaded John Fernald to allow him free tuition for the next two years.

Terry Hands was also a student at the same time, but had left a little earlier than Bailie and formed the Everyman Theatre with Peter James in Liverpool. On leaving RADA Bailie was invited to join the Everyman in 1964. Amongst other roles he played Tolen in The Knack..., Becket in Murder in the Cathedral, Dion in The Great God Brown, MacDuff in Macbeth and Lucky in Waiting for Godot.

After a year there, he came back to London and auditioned for and was accepted by Sir Laurence Olivier joining the National Theatre. He played minor roles and understudied Olivier in different plays, for instance in Love for Love.

Terry Hands, who had by now joined the Royal Shakespeare Company (RSC) at Stratford-upon-Avon (and later became its artistic director), invited Bailie to join them as an associate artist (1965). There he portrayed "Florizel" opposite Judi Dench's "Perdita" in The Winter's Tale along with "Valentine" in The Two Gentlemen of Verona, "The Bastard" in King John, "Kozanka" in The Plebeians Rehearse the Uprising and "Leslie" in The Madness of Lady Bright.

During the early 1970s he worked with Stomu Yamashta at his Red Buddha Theatre. He was cast as the lead in a show called Raindog, requiring him to do everything from singing and dancing, to performing Martial Arts and gymnastics – which he frankly admits was a demand too far and when Yamashta offered him a paltry sum for performing the opportunity was there to depart which he did.
He was then cast by Michael E. Briant in 1976 to play the part of the villain "Dask" in the Doctor Who serial The Robots of Death. He also played in a number of other series prominent at the time.

For personal reasons Bailie then had a long recess in his acting career. Between 1980 and 1989 he ran a furniture-making business. In 1990 he closed that down and returned to acting, having in fact to virtually restart his career. It didn't help that at exactly this point he had to have a cancer removed from his lip, which required learning to speak again. Whilst awaiting work in the acting field he busied himself with CAD design, self-training and writing computer programs and also doing health and safety work in the building industry.

In the mid-1990s after playing alongside Brian Glover in The Canterbury Tales he made a comeback in the film business as "Skewer" in Cutthroat Island (1995), then played an English Judge in The Messenger: The Story of Joan of Arc (1999), and also "The Engineer" in Gladiator (2000).

Bailie's best-known work in film is the role of "Cotton", a mute pirate who has his tongue cut out, so he trained his parrot, also named Cotton, to speak on his behalf, though it cannot say more than stock phrases. Bailie first appears as Cotton in Pirates of the Caribbean: The Curse of the Black Pearl (2003) as one of the pirates Jack Sparrow chooses in Tortuga. He is one of the Black Pearl crewmembers to survive the Kraken attack in the sequel Dead Man's Chest (2006), and also played Cotton in the third instalment: At World's End (2007). His character did not say a single line in the three films. According to Bailie, he found it to be a problem and proposed to director Gore Verbinski and writer Terry Rossio a storyline that Cotton was able to speak, but it was not included in films.

In 2014, David joined the ensemble cast of British-American short Artificio Conceal  for the role of Vitruvius. The film, written and directed by Ayoub Qanir, was selected to film festivals worldwide including Cannes Film Festival's Short Film Corner , Edinburgh International Film Festival and Seattle International Film Festival.

Bailie reprised his Doctor Who role as Dask in the Kaldor City audio drama series. He was also involved in Big Finish Productions audio dramas playing the "Celestial Toymaker".

Bailie also worked as a professional photographer, portraiture and landscapes being his speciality.

He established a YouTube channel, mdebailes, where he uploaded readings and performance excerpts.

Filmography

Film

Television

References

External links 
 
 Bailie's website
 David Bailie at Theatricalia

1937 births
2021 deaths
20th-century South African male actors
21st-century South African male actors
Alumni of RADA
South African male film actors
South African male television actors
People from Johannesburg
White South African people
South African YouTubers
Royal Shakespeare Company members
South African expatriates in the United Kingdom